Gavriil Musicescu (March 20, 1847, Izmail, Bessarabia Governorate, now in Ukraine – December 21, 1903, Iași, Romania) was a Romanian composer, conductor and musicologist, father of the pianist and musical pedagogue Florica Musicescu.

Born in Budjak region, southern Bessarabia, he studied music and composition in Saint Petersburg and Iași. He is the author of numerous compositions of choral music. Musicescu settled in Romania and, from 1872 until his death in 1903, taught at the Iași Conservatory.

Gallery

External links
Gavriil Musicescu (1847-1903), at the site of the Iaşi Philharmonic 

1847 births
1903 deaths
People from Izmail
Romanian composers
Romanian musicians
Burials at Eternitatea cemetery